Uladzimir Maroz (born 4 September 1985) is a retired Belarusian professional footballer.

External links

1985 births
Living people
Belarusian footballers
Belarusian expatriate footballers
Expatriate footballers in Ukraine
FC Dynamo Brest players
FC SKVICH Minsk players
FC Darida Minsk Raion players
FC Torpedo-BelAZ Zhodino players
FC Metalurh Zaporizhzhia players
FC Vitebsk players
FC Dnepr Mogilev players
Association football midfielders
People from Zhodzina
Sportspeople from Minsk Region